Cytochrome c oxidase assembly factor COX14 is a protein that in humans is encoded by the COX14 gene. This gene encodes a small single-pass transmembrane protein that localizes to mitochondria. This protein may play a role in coordinating the early steps of cytochrome c oxidase (COX; also known as complex IV) subunit assembly and, in particular, the synthesis and assembly of the COX I subunit of the holoenzyme. Mutations in this gene have been associated with mitochondrial complex IV deficiency. Alternative splicing results in multiple transcript variants.

Structure
The COX14 gene is located on the q arm of chromosome 12 at position 13.12 and it spans 8,476 base pairs. The COX14 gene produces a 6.6 kDa protein composed of 57 amino acids. COX14 is a component of the enzyme MITRAC (mitochondrial translation regulation assembly intermediate of cytochrome c oxidase complex) complex, and the structure contains a central transmembrane domain.

Function
The COX14 gene encodes for a core protein component of the MITRAC (mitochondrial translation regulation assembly intermediate of cytochrome c oxidase complex) complex, which is required for the proper regulation of complex IV assembly. Complex IV of the mitochondrial respiratory chain is essential in catalyzing the oxidation of cytochrome c by molecular oxygen. COX14 has been shown to contribute to the early stages of complex IV assembly by coelution with COX1 and COX4 for nucleation of the assembly. The protein participates in the coupling synthesis of COX1 followed by an assembly of nascent subunits into the holoenzyme complex IV. The knockdown of the protein COX14 involving small interfering RNA in regular human fibroblast has been shown to result in a complex IV defect with reduced activity.

Clinical significance
Variants of COX14 have been associated with the mitochondrial Complex IV deficiency, a deficiency in an enzyme complex of the mitochondrial respiratory chain which catalyzes the oxidation of cytochrome c utilizing molecular oxygen. The deficiency is characterized by heterogeneous phenotypes ranging from isolated myopathy to severe multisystem disease affecting several tissues and organs. Other Clinical Manifestations include hypertrophic cardiomyopathy, hepatomegaly and liver dysfunction, hypotonia, muscle weakness, exercise intolerance, developmental delay, delayed motor development and mental retardation.
A mutation in the homozygous missense mutation c.88G>A in the COX14 gene has resulted in the dysfunction of complex IV assembly and an unstable nascent enzyme complex.

Interactions 
Like COA3, COX14 is a key component of the MITRAC (mitochondrial translation regulation assembly intermediate of cytochrome c oxidase complex) complex. In addition, it has interactions with proteins such as COX17, COX1, LMNA, COA3, SPPL2B, and others.

References

Further reading 

Human proteins
Genes on human chromosome 12